Lollipop Power, Inc. was a nonprofit American independent publisher of children's books. Based in Chapel Hill, North Carolina, the group emerged from a culture of lesbian feminist organizing and was founded in 1969. Operating as a publishing collective of a rotating group of around 10 members, the press published non-sexist, non-racist picture books for children to counter depictions of gender-stereotyped roles in mainstream children's books.

The press grew until 1975, when it got its own office but sales began to plateau. At its peak, the press sold about 1,500 books monthly. A changing publishing landscape contributed to the eventual closure of the press in 1986, when its titles were transferred to nearby Carolina Wren Press. The press published some of the earliest picture books with explicitly queer characters, shaping the early history of the field of LGBTQ children's literature.

History
Lollipop Power Inc. emerged from a culture of lesbian feminist organizing and independent publishing in the U.S. state of North Carolina at the end of the 1960s. From this context, three publishers and two lesbian feminist journals were established in the 1960s and 1970s in North Carolina, including Lollipop Power which was founded as a nonprofit in 1969 in Chapel Hill. Its founding collective included publisher Judy Hogan, who would also found Carolina Wren Press in the state in 1976.

Lollipop Power's mission was to publish children's books with non-sexist and non-racist stories. The publishing collective sought to do this to offer an alternative to the predominantly white and male stories being told in mainstream children's literature, believing that "sex stereotypes can and should be eliminated at a very early age". Members operated the publishers without significant professional publishing experience; stories were accepted both from press members and outside submissions. Lollipop Power members selected illustrators for the books based on illustrations they submitted for sample passages from the texts, with final approval of the books given to the press's board to vote upon. Authors and illustrators were not paid as of 1972, with only the member handling mail distribution of the works receiving financial compensation. By 1976, most of the collective's 10 members (none of whom were the founding members by that time) were able to pay themselves around or slightly above minimum wage.

Kathi Gallagher of the press wrote in 1982 that the founding collective envisioned the publisher as a platform to assist other feminists who desired books without stereotyped gender roles, but orders from other sources like schools, libraries, and bookstores quickly forced the collective to change their model. Its first book, Jenny's Secret Place (1971), was delayed due to lack of funds; once it was published, the company was "swamped with orders". As the company grew into the mid-1970s, it became responsible for all aspects of its publishing process including design, typesetting, and printing. The press reported annual increases in sales through 1975, when its monthly sales averaged 1,500 books. That year, the press began to work out of an office with a printer of its own; before that, "chaos reigned. Books were stored under beds, in attics, under ping-pong tables."

After 1976, sales of Lollipop Power books plateaued and then declined as the group began to release fewer works each year (including none in 1978). Gallagher wrote that an uptake in less gender-stereotyped works from larger commercial publishers like Macmillan Publishers and McGraw Hill may have contributed to the shift, but so too may have the public perception that the mid-1970s interest in non-sexist, non-racist children's literature was a fad or "one battle that had been irrevocably won". The press ceased operations in 1986, with its titles moved to Hogan's Carolina Wren Press. It published at least one more title, Phyllis Hacken Johnson's The Boy Toy, in 1988 as an imprint of Carolina Wren Press.

Legacy
Lollipop Power published Jane Severance's When Megan Went Away (1979) and Lots of Mommies (1983), among the first picture books to depict explicitly queer characters. The publisher also released several other books dealing with gender-nonconforming characters, like Bruce Mack's Jesse's Dream Skirt (1979) and Hacken Johnson's The Boy Toy (1988). Because so few presses in the 1970s and 1980s were publishing children's literature with queer characters, the press shaped the earliest history of LGBTQ children's literature. However, the press's limited distribution meant that its works were not widely available. As of 1979, it was one of just seven independent presses of children's literature in the U.S., and the only one located in the Southeastern United States.

Selected titles
 Jenny's Secret Place (1970), written by Sara Evans Boyte
 Martin's Father (1971), written by Margrit Eichler, illustrated by Bev Magennis
 Exactly Like Me (1972), written and illustrated by Lynn Phillips
 Joshua's Day (1972), written by Sandra Lucas Surowiecki, illustrated by Patricia Riley Lenthall
 The Sheep Book (1972), written and illustrated by Carmen Goodyear
 The Magic Hat (1973), written by Kim Westsmith Chapman, illustrated by Kitty Riley Clark
 Just Momma and Me (1975), written and illustrated by Christine Engla Eber
 The Lost Bellybutton (1976), written by Margaret Morganroth Gullette, illustrated by Leslie Udry
 The Clever Princess (1977), written by Ann Tompert, illustrated by Patricia Riley
 When Megan Went Away (1979), written by Jane Severance, illustrated by Tea Schook
 Jesse's Dream Skirt (1979), written by Bruce Mack, illustrated by Marian Buchanan
 In Christina's Toolbox (1981), written by Dianne Homan, illustrated by Mary Heine
 Lots of Mommies (1983), written by Jane Severance, illustrated by Jan Jones
 The Boy Toy (1988), written by Phyllis Hacken Johnson, illustrated by Lena Shiffman

References

Sources

 
 
 
 
 

 
 
 
 
 
 

1969 establishments in North Carolina
1986 disestablishments in North Carolina
American companies established in 1969
American companies disestablished in 1986
Book distributors
Book publishing companies based in North Carolina
Children's book publishers
Lesbian feminist literature
Publishing companies established in 1969
Publishing companies disestablished in 1986
Feminist book publishing companies
Non-profit publishers
Small press publishing companies